Mahadevi Varma (26 March 1907 – 11 September 1987) was an Indian Hindi-language poet, essayist, sketch story writer and an eminent personality of Hindi literature. She is considered one of the four major pillars of the Chhayawadi era in Hindi literature. She has been also addressed as the Modern Meera. Poet Nirala had once called her "Saraswati in the vast temple of Hindi Literature".  Varma had witnessed India both before and after independence. She was one of those poets  who worked for the wider society of India. Not only her poetry but also her social upliftment work and welfare development among women were also depicted deeply in her writings. These largely influenced not only the readers but also the critics especially through her novel Deepshikha.

She developed a soft vocabulary in the Hindi poetry of Khadi Boli, which before her was considered possible only in Braj bhasha. For this, she chose the soft words of Sanskrit and Bangla and adapted to Hindi. She was well-versed in music. The beauty of her songs lies in the tone that captures the euphemistic style of sharp expressions. She started her career with teaching. She was the Principal of Prayag Mahila Vidyapeeth. She was married, but she chose to live an ascetic life. She was also a skilled painter and creative translator. She had the distinction of receiving all the important awards in Hindi literature. As the most popular female litterateur of the last century, she remained revered throughout her life. The year 2007 was celebrated as her birth cenhenotenary. Later, Google also celebrated the day through its Google Doodle.

Life and education

Early life 
Varma was born on 26 March 1907 in a Hindu Brahmin family of Farrukhabad, Uttar Pradesh, India. Her father Govind Prasad Varma was a professor in a college in Bhagalpur. Her mother's name was Hem Rani Devi. Her mother was a  religious, passionate and vegetarian woman with a keen interest in music. Her mother would recite for many hours of Ramayana, Gita and Vinay patrika. On the contrary, her father was a scholar, music lover, atheist, a hunting enthusiast and a cheerful person. Sumitranandan Pant and Suryakant Tripathi Nirala were close friends of Mahadevi Varma. It is said that for 40 years Varma kept tying Rakhis to Nirala.

Education 
Varma was originally admitted to a Convent school, but upon protests and an unwilling attitude, she took admission in Crosthwaite Girls College at Allahabad. According to Varma, she learned the strength of unity while staying in the hostel at Crosthwaite. Here students of different religions lived together. Varma started to write poems secretly; but upon discovery of her hidden stash of poems by her roommate and senior Subhadra Kumari Chauhan (known in the school for writing poems), her hidden talent was exposed.

She and Subhadra also used to send poems to publications such as weekly magazines and managed to get some of their poems published. Both the budding poets also attended poetry seminars, where they met eminent Hindi poets, and read out their poems to the audience. This partnership continued till Subhrada graduated from Crosthwaite.

In her childhood biography Mere Bachpan Ke Din (My Childhood Days), Varma has written that she was very fortunate to be born into a liberal family at a time when a girl child was considered a burden upon the family. Her grandfather reportedly had the ambition of making her a scholar; although he insisted that she comply with tradition and marry at the age of nine. Her mother was fluent both in Sanskrit and Hindi, and was a very religious pious lady. Mahadevi credits her mother for inspiring her to write poems, and to take an interest in literature.

Following her graduation in 1929, Mahadevi absolutely refused to go and live with her husband Swarup Narain Varma  because they were incompatible. She found his hunting and meat-eating offensive.Since she had been married as a child, she was to go and live with her husband only after completing her education, as was the custom, but when she finished her BA, she absolutely refused to live with him. Her remorseful father offered to convert along with her if she wanted to divorce and remarry (as Hindus could not legally divorce at the time) but she refused, saying she wanted to remain single. She even unsuccessfully tried to convince her husband to remarry. Later, she was reported to have considered becoming a Buddhist nun but eventually chose not to, although she studied Buddhist Pali and Prakrit texts as part of her master's degree.

Professional career

Literary 
Nihar (IPA : Nīhār) was her debut collection of poems. In 1930, Nihar, in 1932, Rashmi, in 1933, Neerja were composed by her. In 1935, her collection of poems called Sandhyageet was published. In 1939, four poetic collections were published with their artworks under the title Yama. Apart from these, she had written 18 novels and short stories in which Mera Parivar (My Family), Smriti ki Rekhaye (Lines of Memory), Patha ke Sathi (Path's Companions), Srinkhala ke Kariye (Series of Links) and Atit ke Chalachrit (Past Movies) are prominent. She is also considered the pioneer of feminism in India.

Women's advocacy 

Varma's career had always been revolved around writing, editing and teaching. She contributed significantly to the development of Prayag Mahila Vidyapeeth in Allahabad . This kind of responsibility was a considered a revolutionary step in the field of women's education during that time. She also had been its Principal. In 1923, she took over the women's leading magazine Chand . In the year 1955, Varma established the Literary Parliament in Allahabad and with the help of Ilachandra Joshi, and took up the editorship of its publication. She laid the foundation of women's poets' conferences in India. Mahadevi was greatly influenced by Buddhism. Under the influence of Mahatma Gandhi, she took up a public service and worked in Jhansi alongside Indian freedom struggle. In 1937, Mahadevi Varma built a house in a village called Umagarh, Ramgarh, Uttarakhand, 25 km from Nainital. She named it Meera Temple. She started working for the village people and for their education till she stayed there. She did a lot of work especially for women's education and their economic self-sufficiency. Today, this bungalow is known as Mahadevi Sahitya Museum. In the series of attempts, she was able to raise the courage and determination for the liberation and development of women. The way she has condemned social stereotypes made her to be known as a woman liberationist. She had also been called a social reformer due to the development work and public service towards women and their education. Throughout her creations, there are no visions of pain or anguish anywhere, but the indomitable creative fury reflected in the society's indomitable desire for change and an innate attachment towards development.

In Hindu Stree Ka Patnitva (The Wifehood of Hindu Women) marriage is compared to slavery. Not being affiliated to any political or financial authority, she writes, women are assigned to lives of being wives and mothers. Her feminism is often overshadowed by her poetic persona. Through poems like Cha, she explored themes and ideas of female sexuality, while her short stories such as Bibia, discusses the subject of experiences of women physical and mental abuse.

She spent most of her life in Allahabad (Prayagraj) of Uttar Pradesh. She died in Allahabad on 11 September 1987.

Works 
Varma was a poet as well as a distinguished prose writer. Her creations are as follows.

Poetry

 Nihar (1930)
 Rashmi (1932)
 Neerja (1933)
 Sandhyageet (1935)
 Pratham Ayam (1949)
 Saptaparna (1959)
 Deepshikha (1942)
 Agni Rekha (1988)

Several other poetic collections of Mahadevi Varma are also published, in which selected songs from the above compositions have been compiled.

Prose
List of selected prose works includes

 Ateet Ke Chalchitr (1961)
 Smriti ki Rekhaye (1943)
 Patha ke Sathi (1956)
 Mera Parivar (1972)
 Sansmaran (1943)
 Sambhasan (1949)
 Shrinkhala ki Kadiyan (1942)
 Vivechamanak Gadya (1972)
 Skandha (1956)
 Himalaya (1973)

Others
Two compilations of children poems of Mahadevi Varma are
 Thakurji Bhole Hai
 Aaj Kharidenge hum Jwala

Critical analysis 
A section of critics are those who believe that the poetry of Mahadevi is very personal. Her agony, anguish, compassion, is artificial.

Moral critics like Ramchandra Shukla have put a question mark on the truth of her anguish and feelings. He quotes  On the other hand Hazari Prasad Dwivedi consider her poetry to be a collective criterion. Poetic works like Deep from (Nihar), Madhur Madhur Mere Deepak Jal from (Neerja) and Mome Sa Tan Gal Hai, concludes that these poems not only explain Mahadevi's self-centerness but also to be considered a representative form of general posture and texture of her poems. Satyaprakash Mishra says about her philosophy of metaphysics related to cinematography - 

American novelist David Rubin had said the following about her works

Prabhakar Shrotriya believe that those who consider her a poetess of anguish and despair do not know how much fire there is in that suffering which exposes the truth of life. He says  It is true that Varma's poetic world comes under the shadow of Chhayavaad (shadowism), but to see her poetry completely unconnected to her era, one would be doing injustice to her. Mahadevi was also a conscious writer. During the Bengal famine in 1973, she had published a poetry collection and also wrote a poem called "Banga Bhu Shanth Vandana" related to Bengal. Similarly, in response to the invasion of China, she had edited a collection of poems called Himalaya.

Honours and awards 

 1956: Padma Bhushan
1979: Sahitya Akademi Fellowship
1982: Jnanpith Award for her poetry collection Yama.
1988: Padma Vibhushan

Beside these, in 1979, the famous Indian filmmaker Mrinal Sen produced a Bengali film on her memoir Woh Chini Bhai titled Neel Akasher Neechey. On 14 September 1991, the Postal Department of the Government of India, issued a doubles stamp of 2 along with Jaishankar Prasad, in  her honor.

Literary contributions

The emergence of Mahadevi Varma in literature happened at a time when the shape of Khadi Boli was being refined. She introduced Braj bhasha softness to Hindi poetry. She gave us a repository of songs with a heartfelt acceptance to Indian philosophy. In this way, she did an important work in the three fields of language, literature and philosophy which later influenced an entire generation. She created a unique rhythm and simplicity in the composition and language of her songs, as well as natural use of symbols and images that draw a picture in the mind of the reader. Her contribution to the prosperity of Chhayavadi poetry is very important. While Jaishankar Prasad gave naturalization to the Chhayavadi poetry, Suryakant Tripathi Nirala embodied the liberation in it and Sumitranandan Pant brought the art of delicateness, but Varma embodied life to the Chhayavadi poetry. The most prominent feature of her poetry is emotionalism and intensity of feeling. Such lively and tangible manifestation of the subtlest subtle expressions of the heart makes 'Varma' among the best Chhayavadi poets. She is remembered with respect for her speeches in Hindi. Her speeches were full of compassion for the common man and firm of truth. At 3rd World Hindi Conference, 1983, Delhi, she was the chief guest of the closing ceremony.

Apart from the original creations, she was also a creative translator with works like in her translation ' Saptaparna ' (1980). With the help of her cultural consciousness, she has presented 39 selected important pieces of Hindi poetry in her work by establishing the identity of Vedas, Ramayana, Theragatha and the works of Ashwaghosh, Kalidas, Bhavabhuti and Jayadeva. At the beginning, in the 61-page ' Apna Baat ', she has given a thorough research in relation to this invaluable heritage of Indian wisdom and literature, which enriches the overall thinking and fine writing of Hindi, not just limited female writing.

See also
Chhayavaad
Jaishankar Prasad
Suryakant Tripathi 'Nirala'
Sumitranandan Pant

References

Citations

Sources

Notes

Further reading

External links 
Mahadevi Verma Jivan Parichay (Hindi Jivan Parichay)
 
 
Mahadevi Verma at Kavita Kosh (Hindi)
 Mahadevi Verma at Anubhuti
Mahadevi Verma | Kavishala Sootradhar

1907 births
1987 deaths
Hindi-language poets
Hindi-language writers
Indian women poets
Indian women educational theorists
People from Farrukhabad
Writers from Allahabad
University of Allahabad alumni
Recipients of the Padma Vibhushan in literature & education
Recipients of the Padma Bhushan in literature & education
Recipients of the Sahitya Akademi Fellowship
Recipients of the Jnanpith Award
Poets from Uttar Pradesh
Women writers from Uttar Pradesh
20th-century Indian poets
20th-century Indian women writers
20th-century Indian educational theorists
Novelists from Uttar Pradesh
Indian women novelists
20th-century Indian novelists
Indian women short story writers
20th-century Indian short story writers
Women educators from Uttar Pradesh
Educators from Uttar Pradesh
Women school principals and headteachers
20th-century women educators